The planned high-speed railway in the UK known as High Speed 2 has encountered significant opposition from various organisations and individuals.

Political parties 

The Green Party voted to oppose the HS2 plans at its Spring 2011 conference on environmental and economic grounds.
 The UK Independence Party (UKIP) is opposed nationally and locally to the proposed HS2 plans. UKIP has been campaigning against HS2 as it is also part of the EU's Trans-European Transport Network (TEN-T) Policy. It had previously proposed a much larger and more expensive three-line high-speed network running from London to Newcastle (and on to Scotland), London to Bristol (and on to Wales) and London to Birmingham along with upgrading several other sections of the WCML and Scottish rail to high speed in its 2010 manifesto.
 The Brexit Party said in 2019 it would save £200 billion by shelving the HS2 project.

Campaign groups 

Stop HS2 organises nationally and represents local action groups along the route, under the slogan "No business case. No environmental case. No money to pay for it.". Chair Penny Gaines commented in 2020 that "The case for HS2 has always been poor, and is simply getting worse".
Extinction Rebellion, a global protest movement. Alongside Stop HS2, Extinction Rebellion organised a walk of 125 miles along the proposed railway line in June 2020.
The HS2 Action Alliance was an umbrella group for opposition groups. These included ad hoc entities, residents' associations, and parish councils. The Alliance's primary aim was to prevent HS2 from happening; secondary aims included evaluating and minimising the impacts of HS2 on individuals, communities and the environment, and communication of facts about HS2, and its compensation scheme. The HS2 Action Alliance criticised the Department of Transport's demand forecasts as being too high, as well as having other shortcomings in the assessment methodology.
 Action Groups Against High Speed Two (AGHAST) claimed in 2011 that the project was not viable economically.
The Right Lines Charter, an umbrella group established in 2011 for several environmental and other organisations that support the principle of a high-speed rail network but believe that the current HS2 scheme is unsound. Members include the Campaign for Better Transport, the Campaign to Protect Rural England, Friends of the Earth, Greenpeace, and Railfuture.

Environmental groups 

The Woodland Trust opposes the current route of the proposed High Speed 2 rail link because of its impact on ancient woodland. It reports that 108 ancient woods are threatened with loss or damage from the project.
The Wildlife Trusts, which have criticised the proposals, stating that the former Government's policy on High Speed Rail (March 2010) underestimated the effect on wildlife habitats (with 4 SSSIs and over 50 of other types of nature site affected), as well as noting that the proposals had not comprehensively shown any significant effect on transport carbon emissions and questioning the economic benefits of a line. The trusts called for additional research to be done on the effects of a high-speed line.
 The Selborne Society voiced its concern about the proximity of HS2 to Perivale Wood, a Local Nature Reserve in Ealing.
The Campaign to Protect Rural England believes that lower speeds would increase journey times only slightly, while allowing the line to run along existing motorway and railway corridors, reducing intrusion.

Other groups 

The National Trust. Fiona Reynolds, at the time Director-General, stated in 2010: "there are lots of questions about the economics and above all the impact".
The New Economics Foundation, a think-tank promoting environmentalism, localism and anti-capitalism. It published a formal response to the public consultation in August 2011 which concluded that the case for a high-speed rail link was incomplete and that the benefits of the scheme had been "over-emphasised" by its promoters.
The Taxpayers Alliance, an anti-tax pressure group, describes the project as a white elephant.
The Independent newspaper considers the costs excessive and the benefits uncertain. An investigation published in February 2013 claimed that 350 wildlife sites would be destroyed by the new HS2 line and an accompanying editorial argued that environmentalists should oppose the project. A separate investigation published in March 2013 suggested that the project was unlikely to keep within its £33 billion budget.
The Federation of Small Businesses, which has expressed scepticism over the need for high-speed rail, stating that roads expenditure was more useful for its members.

Individuals and politicians

Notable individuals
 Chris Packham, naturalist
Noddy Holder, musician

Conservative politicians
 Steve Baker, Conservative MP for Wycombe and Chair, European Research Group
 Shaun Bailey, Conservative Candidate for London Mayoral election 2021
 Bob Blackman, Conservative MP for Harrow West since 2010
Sir Graham Brady, Conservative MP for Altrincham and Sale West since 1997
Andrew Bridgen, Conservative MP for North West Leicestershire since 2010
Rob Butler, Conservative MP for  Aylesbury since 2019
Theodora Clarke, Conservative MP for Stafford since 2019
Phillip Davies, Conservative MP for  Shipley since 2005
Liam Fox, Conservative MP for North Somerset since 1992
Dame Cheryl Gillan, Conservative MP for Amersham and Chesham from 1992 to 2021
James Grundy, Conservative MP for Leigh since 2019
 Adam Holloway, Conservative MP for Gravesham since 2010
Chris Loder, Conservative MP for  West Dorset since 2019
Joy Morrissey, Conservative MP for Beaconsfield since 2019
Laurence Robertson, Conservative MP for Tewkesbury since 1992
David Simmonds, Conservative MP for  Ruislip, Northwood & Pinner since 2019
Greg Smith, Conservative MP for Buckingham since 2019
Alexander Stafford, Conservative MP for Rother Valley since 2019
William Wragg, Conservative MP for Hazel Grove since 2015

Labour politicians
Tony Berkeley, Labour Member of the House of Lords

 The Lord Mandleson, Former Labour MP and House of Lords member since 2008
 Barry Sheerman, Labour MP for Huddersfield since 1979
 Tulip Siddiq, Labour MP for Hampstead and Kilburn since 2015
 Christian Wolmar, Former London Labour Mayoral candidate

Green Party politicians
 Jonathan Bartley, Co-Leader of the Green Party and Leader of the Opposition on Lambeth London Borough Council since 2018
 Siân Berry, Co-Leader of the Green Party and Green member of the London Assembly since 2016
 Caroline Lucas, Green MP for Brighton, Pavilion since 2010
 Caroline Russell, Leader of the Green Party on the London Assembly since 2016

Brexit Party politicians
 Nigel Farage, Leader of the Brexit Party

Local government 
The 51m group consists of 19 local authorities along or adjacent to the Phase One route. It suggests the project will cost each Parliamentary Constituency £51 million. Constituent members of 51m include:
Buckinghamshire County Council
London Borough of Hillingdon
Warwickshire County Council
Leicestershire County Council
Northamptonshire County Council
Oxfordshire County Council
Coventry City Council
Camden Borough Council
Staffordshire County Council
Derby City Council was disappointed at the chosen location for the East Midlands Hub station in Toton, preferring a route that would make use of the existing Derby railway station. These plans are opposed by Derbyshire County Council, Nottingham City Council, and Rushcliffe Borough Council.
The Coventry and Warwickshire Chamber of Commerce opined that HS2 offered no benefit to its area.
Wakefield Council opposes HS2, preferring instead "to upgrade rail connections between the cities and towns in the North's east and west and to make the national highway fit for purpose".

See also
List of support for High Speed 2
Rail transport in Great Britain
Turin–Lyon high-speed railway

References

Support and opposition
HS2
HS2
HS2